Rinbudhoo Jewellers island (Dhivehi: ރިނބުދޫ) is one of the inhabited islands of Dhaalu Atoll. People of Rinbudhoo are among the most skilled silver and goldsmiths in the Maldives. The islanders earn money in several ways like fishing, jewellery making, construction works etc. Rinbudhoo island was affected by the 2004 tsunami and 2 people were dead.

Geography

Demography

References

Islands of the Maldives